The Eastern District is one of the 35 districts of the Lutheran Church–Missouri Synod (LCMS), and covers: most of upstate New York; Pennsylvania, with the exception of York and Lancaster Counties; and Garrett County at the western corner of the Maryland panhandle. The rest of New York, including New York City, is in the Atlantic District; York and Lancaster Counties in Pennsylvania and the remainder of Maryland are in the Southeastern District. In addition, sixteen congregations in the Eastern District's area are in the non-geographic English District, and eleven Pennsylvania congregations are in the SELC District. The Eastern District includes 135 congregations and missions, subdivided into 16 circuits, as well as 30 preschools and 13 elementary schools. Baptized membership in Eastern District congregations is approximately 40,000.

The Eastern District is one of the Synod's four original districts formed in 1854; much of its territory was separated into the Atlantic District in 1906. District offices are located in Williamsville, New York.  Delegates from each congregation meet in convention every three years to elect the district president, vice presidents, circuit counselors, a board of directors, and other officers. The Rev. John Pingel became the district president in 2022. The 100th Regular Convention was held June 17-18, 2022 in Tonawanda, New York.

Presidents

Rev. Ernst G. W. Keyl, 1854-69
Rev. P. Carl Gross, 1869-75
Rev. J. P. Beyer, 1875-88
Rev. Peter Brand, 1888-99
Rev. Herman H. Walker, 1899-1915
Rev. Franz (Francis) C. Verwiebe, 1915-21
Rev. William Broeker, 1921-28
Rev. J. K. E. Horst, 1928-31
Rev. Franz (Francis) C. Verwiebe, 1931-38
Rev. Oscar A. Sauer, 1938-39
Rev. Paul Fretthold, 1939-45
Rev. Charles A. Behnke, 1945-55
Rev. Eric C. Malte, 1955-58
Rev. Gustav M. Karkau, 1958-66
Rev. Herman R. Frincke, 1966-76
Rev. Arnold Kromphardt, 1978-91
Rev. Dr. David Belasic, 1991-2000
Rev. Dr. John G. Brunner, 2000-2009
Rev. Dr. Chris C. Wicher, 2009-2022
Rev. John Pingel, 2022-present 

Frincke was one of four district presidents who were removed from office by Synod President J. A. O. Preus on April 2, 1976 for non-compliance with synodical directives on the ordination and placement of improperly endorsed ministerial candidates from Seminex .

References

External links
Eastern District web site
LCMS: Eastern District
LCMS Congregation Directory

Lutheran Church–Missouri Synod districts
Lutheranism in Maryland
Lutheranism in New York (state)
Lutheranism in Pennsylvania
Religious organizations established in 1854
Lutheran districts established in the 19th century
1854 establishments in the United States